Pashnya is a rural locality (a village) in Yugo-Kamskoye Rural Settlement, Permsky District, Perm Krai, Russia. The population was 51 as of 2010. There are 19 streets.

Geography 
Pashnya is located 60 km southwest of Perm (the district's administrative centre) by road. Yugo-Kamsky is the nearest rural locality.

References 

Rural localities in Permsky District